Ministry of Aboriginal Affairs, Department of Aboriginal Affairs, or Aboriginal Affairs may refer to:


Australia
Federal
Minister for Indigenous Australians
Department of Aboriginal Affairs, in Australia 1972–1990
States and territories
Aboriginal Affairs NSW, formerly New South Wales Department of Aboriginal Affairs
Minister for Aboriginal Affairs (New South Wales)
Minister for Aboriginal Affairs (Northern Territory)
Department of Seniors, Disability Services and Aboriginal and Torres Strait Islander Partnerships (since 2020)
Minister for Aboriginal Affairs (South Australia), as of 2022 Kyam Maher
Department of Aboriginal Affairs (Western Australia), dissolved in 2017
Minister for Aboriginal Affairs (Western Australia)

Canada
Ministry of Aboriginal Affairs (Ontario), later Ministry of Indigenous Affairs
Ministry of Aboriginal Affairs (Quebec), (French: Secrétariat aux affaires autochtones)
Minister of Aboriginal and Northern Affairs (Manitoba)
Manitoba Aboriginal and Northern Affairs
Minister of Aboriginal Affairs and Northern Development

Other uses
Aboriginal Affairs, a 1983 album by American jazz trombonist Craig Harris

See also

Bureau of Indian Affairs, United States
Foundation for Aboriginal Affairs, a welfare and advocacy organisation in Sydney, Australia, 1964–1977